Days of the New (also known as the Red album or Days of the New III) is the self-titled third and final album by alternative rock band Days of the New.  It was released in 2001 and was originally scheduled for late 2000, but Interscope enlisted Ron Aniello to help the band re-record and remix several songs for the record.  The songs "Hang On to This," "Die Born," and "Once Again" were also added during this process. Reinforcing the Days of the New album color theme, the CD case to Red is translucent red. This is their only album with a "Parental Advisory" label.

Overview
In February 2000, Meeks returned to the studio with a new band. This album incorporated aspects of the previous two; much of the energy from the first album had returned, combined with orchestral interludes similar to the second album. Red also continues the upbeat vibe as emphasized on Green with more emphasis on electric guitar, namely in the opening track "Hang On to This".  The album encompasses several tracks written in 2001 as well as some of Meeks' earliest compositions, such as "Words" and "Fighting With Clay."

The original version of the album was completed in 2000.  At the record label's request, the album was retooled with producer Ron Aniello enlisted to remix tracks and record several new songs. During the 2001 recording sessions, Meeks' cocaine use escalated.  After the album's release that September, he also started using methamphetamine and lost an extreme amount of weight. The tour for the album became chaotic as a result of his use of both drugs.

Reception

The first single, "Hang On to This," charted fairly well and was the most added song on rock radio the week it was released. However, the album was released two weeks after the 9/11 attacks and, with very little promotion, only sold 90,000 copies.  The band maintained a profile touring with the likes of Creed and 3 Doors Down.

Track listing
 "Hang on to This" – 4:11
 "Fighting w/ Clay" – 2:52
 "Days in Our Life" – 3:42
 "Die Born" – 3:56
 "Best of Life" – 5:33
 "Dirty Road" – 4:43
 "Where Are You?" – 3:33
 "Never Drown" – 5:05
 "Words" – 3:42
 "Once Again" – 3:39
 "Giving In" – 5:44
 "Dancing with the Wind" (track ends at 6:19 - includes Hidden Outro track) – 10:09

Original Track listing
 "Words" – 3:42
 "Where Are You?*" – 3:34
 "Fighting w/ Clay" – 3:42
 "Giving In" – 3:56
 "Days in Our Life*" – 3:52
 "Best of Life*" – 3:53
 "Never Drown*" – 5:31
 "Place with the Sky" – 6:05
 "Dirty Road*" – 6:39
 "Dancing with the Wind" – 6:19
 "Angry Light" – 6:32
 "Champagne" - 7:04 (track includes the same Hidden Outro as Dancing with the Wind)

tracks marked include alternate demos
All music and lyrics by Travis Meeks. (excluding Fighting w/ Clay, written by Jesse Vest & Matt Taul)

Outtakes
 "Surface Skimming"
 "Choke Hold" – 5:01

Personnel
Travis Meeks - lead vocals, guitar
Mike Huettig - bass
Ray Rizzo - drums
Sam Anderson - choir conduction
Roy Horton - trombone
John Ray - choir conduction
Roger Soren - bassoon, contrabassoon
Wendy Doyle, Louise Harris - cello
Doug Buchanan, Julie Edwards - viola
John Chisholm - violin
Trevor Johnson - english horn, oboe
Scott Staidle - violin
Marcus Ratzenboeck - violin
Michael Anthony King: guitar, vocals
Ron Aniello - keyboards, production
Mike Shipley: mixing 
Robert Edwards - percussion

Charts
Singles - Billboard (North America)

References

2001 albums
Albums produced by Ron Aniello
Days of the New albums